The Abel House, located at 2601 Paseo Drive in Great Bend, Kansas is a Lustron house built in 1949.  It was listed on the National Register of Historic Places in 2001.

It is a "Westchester Deluxe" model.  It was built and sold by Dan Brack, the Lustron dealer in Great Bend.  It was bought by Walter and Betty Abel in 1949, and they lived there until 1952.  It was then used as a rental until the time of the NRHP registration.

See also
Nagel House, another NRHP-listed Lustron house in Great Bend

References

Lustron houses in Kansas
Houses on the National Register of Historic Places in Kansas
Houses completed in 1949
Barton County, Kansas